The 2020 Columbus Challenger was a professional tennis tournament played on hard courts. It was the ninth edition of the tournament which was part of the 2020 ATP Challenger Tour. It took place in Columbus, United States between 24 February and 1 March 2020.

Singles main draw entrants

Seeds

 1 Rankings are as of February 17, 2020.

Other entrants
The following players received entry into the singles main draw as wildcards:
  Justin Boulais
  Alexander Brown
  Cannon Kingsley
  Peter Kobelt
  John McNally

The following players received entry into the singles main draw as alternates:
  Alexander Cozbinov
  Strong Kirchheimer
  Austin Rapp
  Ruan Roelofse

The following players received entry from the qualifying draw:
  Luca Castelnuovo
  Li Zhe

Champions

Singles

 J. J. Wolf def.  Denis Istomin 6–4, 6–2.

Doubles

 Treat Huey /  Nathaniel Lammons def.  Lloyd Glasspool /  Alex Lawson 7–6(7–3), 7–6(7–4).

References

External links
 Official website

Columbus Challenger
2020 in American tennis
2020 in sports in Ohio
February 2020 sports events in the United States
March 2020 sports events in the United States